Tiritiri Matangi Island is located in the Hauraki Gulf of New Zealand,  east of the Whangaparaoa Peninsula in the North Island and  north east of Auckland. The  island is an open nature reserve managed by the Supporters of Tiritiri Matangi Incorporated, under the supervision of the Department of Conservation and is noted for its bird life, including takahē, North Island kōkako and kiwi. It attracts between 30,000 and 32,000 visitors a year, the latter figure being the maximum allowed by the Auckland Conservation Management Strategy.

The name, Māori for "tossed by the wind", is often popularly shortened to Tiritiri. Māori mythology considers the island to be a float of an ancestral fishing net.

History

Human use 

The first people to settle on the island were Māori of the Kawerau iwi. Later, members of the Ngāti Pāoa moved to the island, like the Kawerau partly for shark fishing until about 1700, when the Kawerau regained control and remained until forced to retreat to Waikato in 1821 when Hongi Hika attacked from the north. There were two pā, Tiritiri Matangi Pā and Papakura Pā.

European (Pākehā) settlers arrived in the early 19th century. In 1841 Ngāti Pāoa sold the land to the crown as part of the Mahurangi Block. When the Kawerau returned, friction ensued as both peoples had a claim to the island. In 1867 the Māori Land Court awarded title to the Crown.

A lighthouse was constructed near the southern end in 1864, and remains in operation. In 1956, a xenon light source was fitted to the lighthouse, creating the most powerful light-beam achieved at the time by a New Zealand lighthouse. It had an output of 11 million candle-power and a range of 58 nautical miles, making it one of the most powerful lights in the world; most lights shone for 27 nautical miles.

The island was farmed from the mid 1800s to 1971, when the lease expired. Management was then vested in the Hauraki Gulf Maritime Park Board.

Regeneration and sanctuary 

The island was chosen as a unique and protected place to provide a public window for rare New Zealand native birds on the edge of a large city and it also lacked introduced predators such as mustelids which were present on the mainland. At that time, although the island was devoid of suitable habitat and food sources, the hope was that native forest would regenerate naturally. It became apparent that natural afforestation was happening very slowly because a forest can only grow at its margins, and the island was covered mostly with dense grass and bracken fern. A plan was formulated to establish a nursery to collect cuttings and seed in order to expand the small pockets of forest habitat that were left in some of the valleys. Pohutukawa was chosen as the main tree as it would eventually provide perches and roosts for birds who would then excrete the seed of the fruits that they had been eating, which would then germinate around the pohutukawa.

The next intervention was eradication in 1993 of the Polynesian rat, known to Māori as kiore, which was destroying seedlings and competing with birds for food. The kiore were killed by an aerial drop of poisoned bait, which was controversial due to its lack of planning and the effect on other wildlife. For instance, 90% of pūkeko on the island were killed, though the resident takahē were kept in an enclosure for the duration of the poisoning.

Eighty-seven species of birds have been observed on or near the island. Eleven native species have been translocated to the island as part of the ongoing restoration project. These are red-crowned parakeet (kākāriki, Cyanoramphus novaezelandiae), North Island saddleback (tīeke, Philesturnus rufusater), brown teal (pāteke, Anas chlorotis), whitehead (pōpokotea, Mohoua albicilla), takahē (Porphyrio hochstetteri), little spotted kiwi (Apteryx owenii), stitchbird (hihi, Notiomystis cincta), North Island kōkako (Callaeas wilsoni), fernbird (mātātā, Poodytes punctatus), North Island tomtit (miromiro, Petroica macrocephala toitoi), and rifleman (titipounamu, Acanthisitta chloris).

Non-avian translocations include 60 tuatara in 2003, Duvaucel's gecko in 2006 and a large insect wetapunga in 2011. Non-native species still present include the Australian brown quail. The success of the conservation project encouraged the creation of a number of similar projects around the Gulf, such as on Motuihe, Motuora and Motutapu.  The closest land on the tip of the Whangaparaoa Peninsula, Shakespear Regional Park has recently (2011) also become a mammalian pest-free fenced sanctuary, increasing immigration of the birds on Tiritiri to the nearby mainland.

A ferry service runs from Auckland Ferry Terminal and Gulf Harbour, and guided tours are available. It is a popular destination for daytrippers, with trips often fully booked, attracting some 30,000 visitors annually, who enjoy an intensity of birdsong rarely heard on the mainland. The island has hosted several tens of                                                                         thousands of conservation volunteers.

See also 
 List of islands of New Zealand

References

External links

Supporters of Tiritiri Matangi - conservation group
Tiritiri Matangi Scientific Reserve (Open Sanctuary) at the Department of Conservation
Audio tour of Tiritiri Matangi, part 1 (Graeme Hill)
Audio tour of Tiritiri Matangi, part 2 (Graeme Hill)
Photographs of Tiritiri Matangi Island held in Auckland Libraries' heritage collections.
 

Islands of the Hauraki Gulf
Protected areas of the Auckland Region
Nature reserves in New Zealand
Island restoration
Islands of the Auckland Region